This article contains information about the literary events and publications of 1944.

Events
February 6 – The première of Jean Anouilh's tragedy Antigone takes place at the Théâtre de l'Atelier in Nazi-occupied Paris.
March 19 – The première of Pablo Picasso's play Desire Caught by the Tail (Le Désir attrapé par la queue) is a private reading in Paris by the author that includes Simone de Beauvoir, Jean-Paul Sartre, Valentine Hugo and Raymond Queneau directed by Albert Camus.
May – The première of Jean-Paul Sartre's existentialist drama Huis Clos is held at the Théâtre du Vieux-Colombier in Nazi-occupied Paris.
June 1 and 5 – The first and (modified) second lines respectively of Paul Verlaine's 1866 poem Chanson d'automne ("Les sanglots longs des violons de l'automne / Bercent mon cœur d'une langueur monotone") are broadcast by the Allies over BBC Radio Londres among coded messages to the French Resistance to prepare for the D-Day landings (second broadcast at 22:15 local time).
June
D-Day landings and Invasion of Normandy: The English soldier-poet Keith Douglas is killed; William Golding commands Landing Craft Tank (Rocket) 460 at Gold Beach; Vernon Scannell (as John Bain) experiences the incident that gives rise to the poem "Walking Wounded" (1965) and is wounded; J. D. Salinger, having landed on Utah Beach, works on an early version of The Catcher in the Rye during lulls in the fighting; Dennis B. Wilson writes the poem that appears as Elegy of a Common Soldier in 2012; Kingsley Amis and John Wyndham serve as signallers; Alexander Baron's experiences of the invasion form the basis of his novel From the City, From the Plough (1948).
The final edition of the Breton nationalist newspaper L'Heure Bretonne is published.
August – With the Liberation of Paris, Jean Genet's novel Notre Dame des Fleurs (1943) can begin to circulate openly.
September 14 – Laurence Olivier takes the title rôle in the production of Richard III that opens at The Old Vic in London.
October 
The contents of the Załuski Library are destroyed during the planned destruction of Warsaw by its Nazi occupiers.
The teenage Günter Grass, having volunteered for active service, is drafted into the Waffen-SS.
October 2
After a few months' internment at Drancy and Birkenau, Benjamin Fondane is one of 700 prisoners put to death in the gas chamber – the last such killings before Birkenau is evacuated. Upon selection, Fondane is heard joking about the irony of his misfortune.
Dylan Thomas is to be best man at the wedding of a friend and fellow Welsh poet, Vernon Watkins, in London, but fails to turn up.
November 22 – The release in England of Laurence Olivier's Henry V makes it the first work of Shakespeare to be filmed in colour.
November 23 – Arthur Miller's play The Man Who Had All the Luck (written in 1940) has its Broadway première at the Forrest Theatre in New York City, but runs for only four performances.
December 26 – Tennessee Williams' semi-autobiographical "memory play" The Glass Menagerie, adapted from a short story, is premièred at the Civic Theatre in Chicago.
unknown date – The English actor-manager Geoffrey Kendal arrives in India for the first time with the Entertainments National Service Association, touring Patrick Hamilton's drama Gaslight; from 1947 Kendal's touring repertory company "Shakespeareana" will perform Shakespeare in towns and villages across India for some decades.

New books

Fiction
Samuel Hopkins Adams – Canal Town
Jorge Amado – Terras do Sem Fim (The Violent Land)
Esther Averill – The Cat Club
Vaikom Muhammad Basheer – Balyakalasakhi
H. E. Bates – Fair Stood the Wind for France
Saul Bellow – Dangling Man
Jorge Luis Borges – Ficciones
 Caryl Brahms and S.J. Simon – No Nightingales
Christianna Brand – Green for Danger
 John Brophy – Target Island
John Bude – Death in White Pyjamas
John Dickson Carr
Till Death Do Us Part
He Wouldn't Kill Patience (as Carter Dickson)
Joyce Cary – The Horse's Mouth
Louis-Ferdinand Céline – Guignol's Band
Peter Cheyney 
 The Dark Street
 They Never Say When
Agatha Christie
Death Comes as the End
Towards Zero
Absent in the Spring (as Mary Westmacott)
Colette – Gigi
Edmund Crispin – The Case of the Gilded Fly
A. J. Cronin – The Green Years
Esther Forbes – Johnny Tremain
 Anthony Gilbert – The Scarlet Button
 Walter Greenwood – Something in My Heart
L. P. Hartley – The Shrimp and the Anemone
John Hersey – A Bell for Adano
Georgette Heyer – Friday's Child
 Margaret Irwin – Young Bess
Charles R. Jackson – The Lost Weekend
 Pamela Hansford Johnson – The Trojan Brothers
Kalki Krishnamurthy – Sivagamiyin Sapatham (சிவகாமியின் சபதம், The Vow of Sivagami)
Pär Lagerkvist – Dvärgen
Margaret Landon – Anna and the King of Siam (basis for 1951 musical The King and I)
Anne Morrow Lindbergh – The Steep Ascent
E. C. R. Lorac 
 Checkmate to Murder
 Fell Murder
H. P. Lovecraft – Marginalia
Curzio Malaparte – Kaputt
W. Somerset Maugham – The Razor's Edge
Oscar Micheaux – The Case of Mrs. Wingate
Gladys Mitchell – My Father Sleeps
Alberto Moravia – Agostino (Two Adolescents)
Gunnar Myrdal – An American Dilemma
Ernest Raymond – For Them That Trespass
Rafael Sabatini – King in Prussia
Anna Seghers
Transit
"Der Ausflug der toten Mädchen" (The Excursion of the Dead Girls, short story)
Anya Seton – Dragonwyck
Clark Ashton Smith – Lost Worlds
Eleanor Smith – Magic Lantern
Howard Spring – Hard Facts
Philip Van Doren Stern – The Greatest Gift (first trade publication)
Rex Stout – Not Quite Dead Enough
Cecil Street – Death Invades the Meeting
Phoebe Atwood Taylor (as Alice Tilton) – Dead Ernest
Donald Wandrei – The Eye and the Finger
Henry S. Whitehead – Jumbee and Other Uncanny Tales
Martin Wickremasinghe – Gamperaliya
Vaughan Wilkins – Being Met Together
Kathleen Winsor – Forever Amber

Children and young people
Esther Averill – The Cat Club
Enid Blyton – The Island of Adventure
Robert Bright – Georgie
Alice Dalgliesh – The Silver Pencil
Eleanor Estes – The Hundred Dresses
Pipaluk Freuchen – Ivik, den faderløse (translated as Eskimo Boy)
Eric Linklater – The Wind on the Moon
Feodor Rojankovsky – The Tall Book of Nursery Tales
Margery Sharp – Cluny Brown
Tasha Tudor – Mother Goose

Drama
Jean Anouilh – Antigone
Reginald Beckwith – A Soldier for Christmas
Ugo Betti – Corruzione al Palazzo di giustizia (Corruption in the Palace of Justice, written)
Bertolt Brecht – The Caucasian Chalk Circle (Der Kaukasische Kreidekreis), written
Daphne du Maurier – The Years Between
Balwant Gargi – Lohākuṭ (Blacksmith)
Philip King – See How They Run
Max Otto Koischwitz – Vision of Invasion (broadcast propaganda)
Esther McCracken – No Medals
Terence Rattigan - Love In Idleness (rewriting of Less Than Kind)
Lawrence Riley – Time to Kill
Jean-Paul Sartre – No Exit (Huis Clos)
John Van Druten – I Remember Mama
Franz Werfel – Jacobowsky and the Colonel (Jacobowsky und der Oberst)
Tennessee Williams – The Glass Menagerie

Poetry
James K. Baxter – Beyond the Palisade
Paul Éluard – Au Rendez-vous allemand (To the German Rendezvous)
Five Young American Poets, volume 3, including work by Eve Merriam, John Frederick Nims, Jean Garrigue, Tennessee Williams and Alejandro Carrión
Nicholas Moore – The Glass Tower
Francis Brett Young – The Island

Non-fiction
Charles William Beebe – Book of Naturalists
Aleister Crowley – The Book of Thoth
Friedrich Hayek – The Road to Serfdom
Max Horkheimer and Theodor W. Adorno – Dialectic of Enlightenment (Dialektik der Aufklärung)
Margaret Landon – Anna and the King of Siam
Gunnar Myrdal – An American Dilemma
Beverley Nichols – Verdict on India
Karl Polanyi – The Great Transformation
L. T. C. Rolt – Narrow Boat
Charles Stevenson – Ethics and Language
G. M. Trevelyan – English Social History: a survey of six centuries from Chaucer to Queen Victoria

Births
January 8 – Terry Brooks, American writer of fantasy fiction
January 17 – Jan Guillou, Swedish author
January 21 – Jack Abbott, American writer (suicide 2002)
February 7 – Witi Ihimaera, New Zealand Māori writer
February 9 – Alice Walker, American novelist and poet
February 11 – Joy Williams, American fiction writer
February 14
Carl Bernstein, American journalist
Alan Parker, English director and writer
February 16 – Richard Ford, American novelist
February 27
Ken Grimwood, American writer (died 2003)
Roger Scruton, English philosopher and writer (died 2020)
April 18 – Kathy Acker, American postmodernist experimental novelist and punk poet (died 1997)
May 13 – Armistead Maupin, American novelist
May 17 – Uldis Bērziņš, Latvian poet and translator
May 18 – W. G. Sebald, German novelist (died 2001)
June 5
John Fraser, Canadian journalist
Nigel Rees, English writer and broadcaster
June 9 - Jeanne DuPrau, American writer
July 21 – Buchi Emecheta, Nigerian-born novelist and children's writer (died 2017)
August 10 – Barbara Erskine, English novelist
August 18 – Paula Danziger, American young adult novelist (died 2004)
August 19 – Bodil Malmsten, Swedish writer (died 2016)
August 22 – Tom Leonard, Scottish dialect poet
August 30 – Molly Ivins, American journalist (died 2007)
September 19 – Ismet Özel, Turkish poet
September 24 – Eavan Boland, Irish poet (died 2020)
October 2 – Vernor Vinge, American science fiction novelist
October 5 – Tomás de Jesús Mangual, Puerto Rican journalist (died 2011)
November 7 – Peter Wilby, English journalist
November 24 – Eintou Pearl Springer, Trinidadian poet
November 28 – Rita Mae Brown, American writer and political activist
December 1 – Tahar Ben Jelloun, French Moroccan-born novelist
December 2 – Botho Strauß, German writer and dramatist
December 9 – Ki Longfellow, American novelist
December 15 – Elizabeth Arnold, English children's writer
December 17 – Jack L. Chalker, American science fiction novelist (died 2005)
December 21 – James Sallis, American crime novelist
unknown dates
Margaret Busby, Ghanaian-born British publisher
Shena Mackay, Scottish-born novelist
Patrick O'Connell, Canadian poet (died 2005)

Deaths
January 6 – Ida Tarbell, American journalist (born 1857)
January 7 – Napoleon Lapathiotis, Greek lawyer and poet (born 1888)
January 8 – Joseph Jastrow, Polish American psychologist (born 1863)
January 15– Armand Praviel, French poet, novelist, and journalist (born 1875)
January 31 – Jean Giraudoux, French dramatist (born 1882)
February – David Vogel, Hebrew poet (died in concentration camp, born 1891)
February 2 – Jane Agnes Stewart, American author, editor, and contributor to periodicals (born 1860)
February 9 – Agnes Mary Frances Duclaux, English-born poet, biographer and novelist (born 1857)
February 10 – Israel Joshua Singer, Yiddish novelist (born 1893)
February 12 – Olive Custance, Lady Alfred Douglas, English poet (born 1874)
February 23 – Augusta Peaux, Dutch poet (born 1859)
March 5
Max Jacob, French poet and critic (died in internment camp, born 1876)
Alun Lewis, Welsh war poet (accidental shooting, born 1915)
March 11 – Irvin S. Cobb, American writer (born 1876)
March 28 – Stephen Leacock, English-born Canadian humorous writer and economist (born 1869)
April 21 – Florence Trail, American educator and author (born 1854)
May 3 – Anica Černej, Slovenian poet (in concentration camp, born 1900)
May 12
Max Brand, American Western, pulp fiction and screenwriter (killed as war correspondent, born 1892)
Sir Arthur Quiller-Couch ("Q"), English author and critic (born 1863)
May 16 – George Ade, American journalist and dramatist (born 1866)
May 24 – Harold Bell Wright, American writer (born 1872)
June – Joseph Campbell, Northern Irish poet (born 1879)
June 9 – Keith Douglas, English war poet (killed in action, born 1920)
June 13 – Elizabeth Wharton Drexel, American socialite and author (born 1868)
June 16 – Marc Bloch, French historian (executed, born 1886)
July 31 – Antoine de Saint-Exupéry, French pilot and writer (lost in aircraft, born 1900)
August 13 – Ethel Lina White, Welsh-born English crime novelist (born 1876)
September 4 – Margery Williams, English-born American children's writer (born 1881)
September 13 – W. Heath Robinson, English cartoonist and illustrator (born 1872)
October 2 – Benjamin Fondane, Romanian-born French poet, playwright and critic (Nazi gas chamber, born 1898)
October 8 – Elsa Lindberg-Dovlette, Swedish writer of harem stories (born 1874)
October 19 – Karel Poláček, Czech writer, humorist and journalist (born 1892)
October 29 – Stephen Hudson (born Sydney Schiff), English novelist, translator and arts patron (born 1868)
November 15 – Edith Durham, English travel writer (born 1863)
December 2 – Filippo Tommaso Marinetti, Italian poet, art theorist and Futurist writer (born 1876)
December 17 – Robert Nichols, English poet and dramatist (born 1893)
December 30 – Romain Rolland, French author and Nobel laureate (born 1866)

Awards
Carnegie Medal for children's literature: Eric Linklater, The Wind on the Moon
James Tait Black Memorial Prize for fiction: Forrest Reid, Young Tom
James Tait Black Memorial Prize for biography: C. V. Wedgwood, William the Silent
Newbery Medal for children's literature: Esther Forbes, Johnny Tremain
Nobel Prize for literature: Johannes V. Jensen
Premio Nadal (first award): Carmen Laforet, Nada
Pulitzer Prize for Poetry: Stephen Vincent Benét, Western Star
Pulitzer Prize for the Novel: Martin Flavin, Journey in the Dark
Shelley Memorial Award for Poetry: E. E. Cummings

References

 
Years of the 20th century in literature